The Splinter Shards the Birth of Separation is the second full-length release by metalcore band Zao, released on Tooth & Nail Records on April 1, 1997.

In 2020, the band repressed the album, alongside the follow up album, Where Blood and Fire Bring Rest, to vinyl with both albums getting around 500 each and new artwork done by David Rankin.

Track listing

Credits
ZAO
Shawn Jonas - vocals
Roy Goudy - guitar
Mic Cox - bass
Jesse Smith - drums

Production
Drew Mazurek - engineer, mixing, producer
Brian Gardner - mastering
Brandon Ebel - executive producer
Jefferson Steele - photography
Eskew Reeder - composer
Steve Wayne - composer

References

Zao (American band) albums
1997 albums
Tooth & Nail Records albums